Janiridae is a family of isopods in the order Isopoda. There are more than 20 genera and 190 described species in Janiridae.

Genera
These 25 genera belong to the family Janiridae:

 Austrofilius Hodgson, 1910
 Caecianiropsis Menzies & Pettit, 1956
 Caecijaera Menzies, 1951
 Carpias Richardson, 1902
 Ectias Richardson, 1906
 Hawaianira Miller, 1967
 Heterias Richardson, 1904
 Iais Bovallius, 1886
 Ianirella
 Ianiropsis G.O.Sars, 1897
 Ianisera Kensley, 1976
 Iathrippa Bovallius, 1886
 Iolella Richardson, 1905
 Jaera Leach, 1814
 Janaira Moreira & Pires, 1977
 Janira Leach, 1814
 Janiralata Menzies, 1951
 Janthura Wolff, 1962
 Mackinia Matsumoto, 1956
 Microjaera Bocquet & Levi, 1955
 Microjanira Schiecke & Fresi, 1970
 Neojaera Nordenstam, 1933
 Protocharon Chappuis, Delamare-Deboutteville & Paulian, 1956
 Rostrobagatus Müller, 1993
 Trogloianiropsis Jaume, 1995

References

Further reading

External links

 

Asellota
Articles created by Qbugbot
Crustacean families